Hoshea (Hōšēaʿ, "salvation";  A'úsiʾ [a-ú-si-ʾ]) was the nineteenth and last king of the Israelite Kingdom of Israel and son of Elah (not the Israelite king Elah).

Accession to the throne
Assyrian records confirm the Biblical account of how he became king. Under Ahaz, Judah had rendered allegiance to Tiglath-Pileser III of Assyria, when the Northern Kingdom under Pekah, in league with Rezin of Aram-Damascus, had attempted to coerce the Judean king into joint action against Assyria. Hoshea, a captain in Pekah's own army, placed himself at the head of the Assyrian party in Samaria; he then removed Pekah by assassination; Tiglath-pileser rewarded Hoshea by making him king over Ephraim (a name used here for the entire northern kingdom), which had been reduced to smaller dimensions. An undated inscription of Tiglath-Pileser III boasts of making Hoshea king after his predecessor had been overthrown:
<blockquote>Israel (lit. : "Omri-house" Bit-Humria)…overthrew their king Pekah (Pa-qa-ha) and I placed Hoshea (''A-ú -si) as king over them. I received from them 10 talents of gold, 1,000(?) talents of silver as their [tri]bute and brought them to Assyria.</blockquote>

The amount of tribute exacted from Hoshea is not stated in Scripture, but Menahem, about ten years previously (743 or 742 BCE) was required to pay 1,000 talents of silver to Tiglath-Pileser in order to "strengthen his hold on the kingdom", apparently against Menahem's rival Pekah. 

So long as Tiglath-pileser was on the throne Hoshea remained loyal; but when Shalmaneser V succeeded, Hoshea made an effort to regain his independence and entered into negotiations with Egypt. Probably misled by favorable promises on the part of Egypt, Hoshea discontinued paying tribute. Winckler contends that in this anti-Assyrian movement, in which Tyre also had a share, a last effort was made on the part of the Arabic commercial states to shut out Assyria from the Arabo-Indian commerce, for which possession of the Mediterranean ports was of vital importance. 

Shalmaneser soon interpreted this as rebellious, and directed his armies against Samaria. The Assyrian Eponym Canon shows that Shalmaneser campaigned "against" (somewhere, name missing) in the years 727, 726, and 725 BCE, and it is presumed that the missing name was Samaria. The Babylonian Chronicle states that Shalmaneser ravaged the city of Sha-ma-ra-in (Samaria). Additional evidence that it was Shalmaneser, not Sargon II who initially captured Samaria, despite the latter's claim, late in his reign, that he was its conqueror, was presented by Tadmor, who showed that Sargon had no campaigns in the west in his first two years of reign (722 and 721 BCE).

End of reign
It is likely that Hoshea, disappointed by the lack of Egyptian support, endeavored to avert the calamity by resuming the payment of tribute, but that, distrusted, he was forced to fight, and was taken prisoner in battle. The capital, though deprived of the ruler, made an effective defense. Nonetheless, the Assyrians captured Samaria after a siege of three years. However, Shalmaneser died shortly after the city fell, and the Assyrian army was recalled to secure the succession of Sargon II. The land of Israel, which had resisted the Assyrians for years without a king, again revolted. Sargon returned with the Assyrian army in 720 BCE, and pacified the province, deporting the citizens of Israel beyond the Euphrates (some 27,290 according to the inscription of Sargon II), and settling people from Babylon, Cuthah, Avva, Hamath and Sepharvaim in their place (2 Kings 17:6, 24). The author of the Books of Kings states this destruction occurred "because the children of Israel sinned against the Lord". What happened to Hoshea following the end of the kingdom of Israel, and when or where he died, is unknown.

King So of Egypt
Hoshea eventually withheld the tribute he promised Shalmaneser, expecting the support of "So, the king of Egypt". There is some mystery as to the identity of this king of Egypt: some scholars have argued that So''' refers to the Egyptian city Sais (as the New English Bible suggests), and thereby refers to king Tefnakht of the 24th Dynasty. However, the principal city of Egypt at this time was Tanis, which suggests that there was an unnecessary correction of the text, and Kenneth Kitchen is correct in identifying "So" with Osorkon IV of the 22nd Dynasty. Considering the fact that Osorkon (730–715 BCE) reigned at the time of Hoshea, this is highly likely. Alternatively it may refer to a lesser Egyptian, such as Siebe, a commander mentioned in the Assyrian record.

See also
List of biblical figures identified in extra-biblical sources

References

8th-century BC Kings of Israel
Year of birth unknown
Year of death unknown
Biblical murderers
Dethroned monarchs